The Vyanda Forest Nature Reserve is found in Burundi. It was established in 1980.This site is 6 km².

References

Protected areas of Burundi
Protected areas established in 1980
1980 establishments in Burundi
Bururi Province